The Racket is a writer-owned, reader-funded website founded in 2021 by a group of former City Pages editors: Jessica Armbruster, Jay Boller, Em Cassel, and Keith Harris. Racket focuses on local news, politics, music, arts, culture, food and drink, and theater in the Minneapolis–Saint Paul area.

References 

Alternative weekly newspapers published in the United States
Newspapers established in 2021
2021 establishments in Minnesota